Ctenoplusia accentifera is a moth of the family Noctuidae. It is found in South-Western Europe, Greece, Africa, the Near East and Asia Minor.

Technical description and variation

P. accentifera Lef Forewing dull  pinkish grey dusted with darker, and with irregular olive brown patches; lines pale; inconspicuous; the inner oblique outwards to median vein, then waved inwards, followed by brown patches ; outer line lunulate, between two brown shades, interrupted below middle by a large brown blotch; a brown blotch from apex, a triangular one below middle of termen, and some small patches along subterminal line, which bears a black white-edged tooth between veins 2 and 3; the mark below median inconspicuous, yellowish grey, laterally finely edged with silvery, oblique and parallel ; hindwing brownish, with dark outer line and broad smoky fuscous border. Larva green, with white dorsal and double white subdorsal lines; spiracular white, less conspicuous in front, yellower behind; tubercles black with long hairs. The wingspan is about 25 mm.

Biology
The larvae feed on Mentha, Coleus and Cichorium species.

References

External links

Fauna Europaea
Moths and Butterflies of Europe and North Africa
Lepiforum.de

Plusiinae
Moths of Europe
Moths of Africa
Moths of Asia
Taxa named by Alexandre Louis Lefèbvre de Cérisy
Moths described in 1827